In molecular biology, multicopper oxidases are enzymes which oxidise their substrate by accepting electrons at a mononuclear copper centre and transferring them to a trinuclear copper centre; dioxygen binds to the trinuclear centre and, following the transfer of four electrons, is reduced to two molecules of water. There are three spectroscopically different copper centres found in multicopper oxidases: type 1 (or blue), type 2 (or normal) and type 3 (or coupled binuclear). Multicopper oxidases consist of 2, 3 or 6 of these homologous domains, which also share homology with the cupredoxins azurin and plastocyanin. Structurally, these domains consist of a cupredoxin-like fold, a beta-sandwich consisting of 7 strands in 2 beta-sheets, arranged in a Greek-key beta-barrel. Multicopper oxidases include:

Ceruloplasmin  (ferroxidase), a 6-domain enzyme found in the serum of mammals and birds that oxidizes different inorganic and organic substances; exhibits internal sequence homology that appears to have evolved from the triplication of a Cu-binding domain similar to that of laccase and ascorbate oxidase.
Laccase  (urishiol oxidase), a 3-domain enzyme found in fungi and plants, which oxidizes different phenols and diamines. CueO is a laccase found in Escherichia coli that is involved in copper-resistance.
Ascorbate oxidase , a 3-domain enzyme found in higher plants.
Nitrite reductase , a 2-domain enzyme containing type-1 and type-2 copper centres.

In addition to the above enzymes there are a number of other proteins that are similar to the multi-copper oxidases in terms of structure and sequence, some of which have lost the ability to bind copper. These include: copper resistance protein A (copA) from a plasmid in Pseudomonas syringae; domain A of (non-copper binding) blood coagulation factors V (Fa V) and VIII (Fa VIII); yeast  Fet3p (FET3) required for ferrous iron uptake; yeast hypothetical protein YFL041w; and the fission yeast homologue SpAC1F7.08.

References

Protein domains
Copper enzymes